Gölcük is a city and district of Kocaeli Province in the Marmara region of Turkey. The city is located at the northern gulf of Armutlu Peninsula on the coast of Gulf of İzmit, a branch of the Sea of Marmara, in the south of the province.

It is the district, where the 1999 earthquake disaster happened. Gölcük is the location of one of the Turkish Navy's main naval bases. Also, Ford Otosan automobile plant is located in Gölcük. The mayor is Ali Yıldırım Sezer (AKP).

History 
It would be more appropriate to start the historical development of Gölcük with the region that the Ancient Greeks and Romans called Bithynia, which also includes Izmit and its surroundings. It is thought that Gölcük was known as Diolkídis in antiquity.

The first step for Gölcük to become a garrison city was taken in 1927. The technical need that emerged with the decision to repair the battleship Yavuz, which was wounded in 1925, led to the establishment of a military shipyard in Gölcük. A pool was built in the same year. The Germans built barracks and repaired Yavuz. Later, these facilities established by the Germans were purchased and the core of the shipyard was established. Parallel to the development of the Turkish Naval Forces, although the fundamental studies were started in 1938, II. World War II prevented these works and the real development of Gölcük Shipyard has been realized since 1950. Gölcük is truly a city founded after the Republic. Except for Halidere, Ulaşlı and Yazlık villages of Gölcük, 21 villages were administered by the Bahçecik Sub-district Directorate of Izmit sanjak.

After the proclamation of the Republic, the town center and the Gendarmerie were established in the village of İhsaniye in 1930. The population of the city of Gölcük started to increase rapidly with the workers and their families coming from the Istanbul shipyards to work in the workshops established for the repair of the battleship Yavuz. In the meantime, Gölcük district was established with the law numbered 3012, which was adopted on June 9, 1936 and entered into force on June 15, 1936. Due to the absence of a building suitable for government offices in Gölcük in the accident organization, it started to work temporarily in the rented buildings in the town of Değirmendere. The Government Mansion, whose construction was completed in a short time, was passed in 1938 and the State organization was settled in Gölcük.

With the establishment of the boiler, the Subdistrict Directorate was abolished from İhsaniye, leaving only the Gendarmerie Organization. In the expropriations made with the Special Expropriation Law No. 3887 enacted in 1942, the Government Organization was transferred to Değirmendere in February 1944, with a decision taken by the Provincial General Assembly, since the Government Mansion remained within the expropriation area. After staying in Değirmendere for 10 years, the government moved back to Gölcük in accordance with the law no. 6322 enacted on March 4, 1954. Due to the government's arrival in Gölcük, the District and Population Organization and the Police Department were established in Değirmendere. This number has increased to 23 by taking Halidere and Ulaşlı villages of Gölcük, which has 21 villages, from Karamürsel. However, with Değirmendere becoming a township, the number of villages decreased to 22. When Damlar District of Saraylı village became a detached village in 1959, the number of villages increased to 23 again.

The Municipality Organization was established in İhsaniye village with the decision of the Council of Ministers dated 06.09.1966 and numbered 4636. Today Gölcük district, one (centre) Gölcük, others; It has 6 towns and 23 villages, namely Değirmendere, İhsaniye, Halıdere, Ulaşlı, Hisareyn, Yazlık. After the 93 War, the Georgian Muslims fleeing the war came from the Adjara region and were settled in the Samanlı Mountains.

Gallery

References

External links
 District governor's official website 
 District municipality's official website 

Populated places in Kocaeli Province
Populated coastal places in Turkey
Districts of Kocaeli Province